Eunoe etheridgei is a scale worm known from off south-eastern Australia at depths of about 400 m.

Description
Number of segments 37–38; elytra 15 pairs. No distinct pigmentation pattern. Anterior margin of prostomium with an acute anterior projection. Lateral antennae inserted ventrally (beneath prostomium and median antenna). Notochaetae distinctly thicker than neurochaetae. Bidentate neurochaetae absent.

References

Phyllodocida
Animals described in 1915